Ypsolopha straminella is a moth of the family Ypsolophidae. It is found in the Russian Far East.

The wingspan is 16.5–17.3 mm. The forewings are greyish yellow irrorated with brown and greyish scales. The hindwings are dark brownish grey, but darker towards the apex.

Etymology
The specific name is derived from Latin stramineus (meaning straw or pale yellow) and refers to the colour of the forewing of the species.

References

Moths described in 2013
Ypsolophidae
Moths of Asia